The electoral district of Sunshine was an electoral district of the Legislative Assembly in the Australian state of Victoria.

Members for Sunshine

Election results

References

Former electoral districts of Victoria (Australia)
1945 establishments in Australia
1955 disestablishments in Australia
1967 establishments in Australia
2002 disestablishments in Australia
Sunshine, Victoria